Jiaxing Women's Normal School was a school in Jiaxing, China. It was run by Christian missionaries.

Notable alumni
Wang Huiwu

References

Schools in Zhejiang
Jiaxing